This item lists those birds of South Asia in the Megapodes, Galliformes, Gruiformes and near passerines.

For an introduction to the birds of the region and a key to the status abbreviations, see List of birds of the South Asia.

For the rest of the species lists, see:
 part 2 Remainder of non-passerines
 part 3 Passerines from pittas to cisticolas
 part 4 Passerines from Old World warblers to buntings

Craciformes
 Family: Megapodiidae
 Nicobar scrubfowl V r Megapodius nicobariensis

Galliformes
 Family: Phasianidae
 Snow partridge r Lerwa lerwa
 See-see partridge Ammoperdix griseogularis
 Tibetan snowcock r Tetraogallus tibetanus
 Himalayan snowcock r Tetraogallus himalayensis
 Buff-throated partridge r Tetraophasis szechenyii
 Chukar R Alectoris chukar
 Black francolin R Francolinus francolinus
 Painted francolin R Francolinus pictus
 Chinese francolin r Francolinus pintadeanus
 Grey francolin R Francolinus pondicerianus 
 Swamp francolin V r Francolinus gularis
 Tibetan partridge r Perdix hodgsoniae
 Common quail rw Coturnix coturnix
 Japanese quail w Coturnix japonica
 Rain quail r Coturnix coromandelica
 Blue-breasted quail r Coturnix chinensis
 Jungle bush quail R Perdicula asiatica
 Rock bush quail R Perdicula argoondah
 Painted bush quail r Perdicula erythrorhyncha
 Manipur bush quail V r Perdicula manipurensis
 Hill partridge r Arborophila torqueola
 Rufous-throated partridge r Arborophila rufogularis
 White-cheeked partridge N r Arborophila atrogularis
 Chestnut-breasted partridge V r Arborophila mandellii
 Mountain bamboo partridge r Bambusicola fytchii 
 Red spurfowl r Galloperdix spadicea
 Painted spurfowl r Galloperdix lunulata
 Sri Lanka spurfowl r Galloperdix bicalcarata 
 Himalayan quail C (ex) Ophrysia superciliosa
 Blood pheasant r Ithaginis cruentus
 Western tragopan V r Tragopan melanocephalus
 Satyr tragopan N r Tragopan satyra
 Blyth's tragopan Vr Tragopan blythii
 Temminck's tragopan r Tragopan temminckii
 Koklass pheasant r Pucrasia macrolopha
 Himalayan monal r Lophophorus impejanus
 Sclater's monal V r Lophophorus sclateri
 Red junglefowl R Gallus gallus
 Grey junglefowl R Gallus sonneratii
 Sri Lanka junglefowl R Gallus lafayetii
 Kalij pheasant R Lophura leucomelanos
 Tibetan eared pheasant N V Crossoptilon harmani
 Cheer pheasant V r Catreus wallichii
 Mrs Hume's pheasant V r Syrmaticus humiae
 Grey peacock pheasant r Polyplectron bicalcaratum
 Indian peafowl R Pavo cristatus
 Green peafowl r Pavo muticus

Anseriformes
 Family: Anatidae
 Fulvous whistling-duck r Dendrocygna bicolor
 Lesser whistling-duck R Dendrocygna javanica
 White-headed duck E V Oxyura leucocephala
 Mute swan V Cygnus olor
 Whooper swan V Cygnus cygnus
 Tundra swan V Cygnus columbianus
 Bean goose V Anser fabalis
 White-fronted goose V Anser albifrons
 Lesser white-fronted goose V Anser erythropus
 Greylag goose W Anser anser
 Bar-headed goose rW Anser indicus
 Snow goose V Anser caerulescens
 Red-breasted goose V Branta ruficollis
 Ruddy shelduck RW Tadorna ferruginea
 Common shelduck w Tadorna tadorna
 White-winged duck E r Cairina scutulata
 Comb duck r Sarkidiornis melanotos
 Cotton pygmy goose r Nettapus coromandelianus
 Mandarin duck V Aix galericulata
 Gadwall W Anas strepera
 Falcated duck V Anas falcata
 Eurasian wigeon W Anas penelope
 Mallard rW Anas platyrhynchos
 Spot-billed duck R Anas poecilorhyncha
 Northern shoveler W Anas clypeata
 Sunda teal r Anas gibberifrons
 Northern pintail W Anas acuta
 Garganey W Anas querquedula
 Baikal teal V V Anas formosa
 Common teal W Anas crecca
 Marbled duck V V Marmaronetta angustirostris
 Pink-headed duck C (ex) Rhodonessa caryophyllacea
 Red-crested pochard w Rhodonessa rufina
 Common pochard W Aythya ferina
 Ferruginous duck N w Aythya nyroca
 Baer's pochard V w Aythya baeri
 Tufted duck W Aythya fuligula
 Greater scaup V Aythya marila
 Long-tailed duck V Clangula hyemalis
 White-winged scoter V Meanitta fusca
 Common goldeneye V Bucephala clangula
 Smew W Mergellus albellus
 Red-breasted merganser V Mergus serrator
 Common merganser RW Mergus merganser

Turniciformes
 Family: Turnicidae
 Small buttonquail R Turnix sylvatica
 Yellow-legged buttonquail R Turnix tanki
 Barred buttonquail R Turnix suscitator

Piciformes
 Family: Indicatoridae
 Yellow-rumped honeyguide N r Indicator xanthonotus
 Family: Picidae
 Eurasian wryneck W Jynx torquilla
 White-browed piculet r Sasia ochracea
 Brown-capped pygmy woodpecker R Dendrocopos nanus
 Grey-capped pygmy woodpecker R Dendrocopos canicapillus
 Brown-fronted woodpecker R Dendrocopos auriceps
 Fulvous-breasted woodpecker R Dendrocopos macei
 Stripe-breasted woodpecker r Dendrocopos atratus
 Yellow-crowned woodpecker R Dendrocopos mahrattensis
 Rufous-bellied woodpecker r Dendrocopos hyperythrus
 Crimson-breasted woodpecker r Dendrocopos cathpharius
 Darjeeling woodpecker R Dendrocopos darjellensis
 Great spotted woodpecker R Dendrocopos major
 Sind woodpecker r Dendrocopos assimilis
 Himalayan woodpecker R Dendrocopos himalayensis
 Rufous woodpecker R Celeus brachyurus
 White-bellied woodpecker r Dryocopus javensis
 Andaman woodpecker N r Dryocopus hodgei
 Lesser yellownape R Picus chlorolophus
 Greater yellownape R Picus flavinucha
 Laced woodpecker r Picus vittatus
 Streak-throated woodpecker R Picus xanthopygaeus
 Scaly-bellied woodpecker R Picus squamatus
 Grey-headed woodpecker R Picus canus
 Himalayan flameback R Dinopium shorii
 Common flameback R Dinopium javanense
 Black-rumped flameback R Dinopium benghalense
 Greater flameback R Chrysocolaptes lucidus
 White-naped woodpecker r Chrysocolaptes festivus
 Pale-headed woodpecker r Gecinulus grantia
 Bay woodpecker r Blythipicus pyrrhotis
 Heart-spotted woodpecker r Hemicircus canente
 Great slaty woodpecker r Mulleripicus pulverulentus
 Family: Megalaimidae
 Great barbet R Megalaima virens
 Brown-headed barbet R Megalaima zeylanica
 Lineated barbet R Megalaima lineata
 White-cheeked barbet R Megalaima viridis
 Yellow-fronted barbet r Megalima flavifrons
 Golden-throated barbet r Megalaima franklinii
 Blue-throated barbet R Megalaima asiatica
 Blue-eared barbet r Megalaima australis
 Crimson-fronted barbet r Megalaima rubricapilla
 Coppersmith barbet R Megalaima haemacephala

Bucerotiformes
 Family: Bucerotidae
 Indian grey hornbill R Ocyceros birostris
 Malabar grey hornbill R Ocyceros griseus
 Sri Lanka grey hornbill R Ocyceros gingalensis
 Great hornbill N R Buceros bicornis
 Brown hornbill Nr Anorrhinus tickelli
 Rufous-necked hornbill Vr Aceros nipalensis
 Wreathed hornbill r Aceros undulatus
 Narcondam hornbill V r Aceros narcondami
 Oriental pied hornbill r Anthracoceros albirostris 
 Malabar pied hornbill Nr Anthracoceros coronatus

Upupiformes
 Family: Upupidae
 Hoopoe RW Upupa epops

Trogoniformes
 Family: Trogonidae
 Malabar trogon r Harpactes fasciatus
 Red-headed trogon r Harpactes erythrocephalus
 Ward's trogon N r Harpactes wardi

Coraciiformes
 Family: Coraciidae
 European roller rp Coracias garrulus
 Indian roller R Coracias benghalensis
 Dollarbird r Eurystomus orientalis
 Family: Alcedinidae
 Blyth's kingfisher N r Alcedo hercules
 Common kingfisher R Alcedo atthis
 Blue-eared kingfisher r Alcedo meninting
 Oriental dwarf kingfisher r Ceyx erithacus
 Family: Halcyonidae
 Brown-winged kingfisher N r Halcyon amauroptera
 Stork-billed kingfisher R Halcyon capensis
 Ruddy kingfisher r Halcyon coromanda
 White-throated kingfisher R Halcyon smyrnensis
 Black-capped kingfisher R Halcyon pileata
 Collared kingfisher r Todiramphus chloris
 Family: Cerylidae
 Crested kingfisher R Megaceryle lugubris
 Pied kingfisher R Ceryle rudis
 Family: Meropidae
 Blue-bearded bee-eater r Nyctyornis athertoni
 Green bee-eater R Merops orientalis
 Blue-cheeked bee-eater PS Merops persicus
 Blue-tailed bee-eater R Merops philippinus
 European bee-eater sP Merops apiaster
 Chestnut-headed bee-eater R Merops leschenaulti

Cuculiformes
 Family: Cuculidae
 Pied cuckoo rS Clamator jacobinus
 Chestnut-winged cuckoo r Clamator coromandus
 Large hawk cuckoo r Hierococcyx sparverioides
 Common hawk cuckoo R Hierococcyx varius
 Hodgson's hawk cuckoo r Hierococcyx fugax
 Indian cuckoo R Cuculus micropterus
 Common cuckoo R Cuculus canorus
 Oriental cuckoo r Cuculus saturatus
 Lesser cuckoo r Cuculus poliocephalus
 Banded bay cuckoo r Cacomantis sonneratii
 Grey-bellied cuckoo r Cacomantis passerinus 
 Plaintive cuckoo r Cacomantis merulinus
 Asian emerald cuckoo r Chrysococcyx maculatus
 Violet cuckoo r Chrysococcyx xanthorhynchus
 Drongo cuckoo r Surniculus lugubris
 Asian koel R Eudynamys scolopacea
 Green-billed malkoha r Phaenicophaeus tristis
 Blue-faced malkoha r Phaenicophaeus viridirostris
 Sirkeer malkoha r Phaenicophaeus leschenaultii
 Red-faced malkoha V r Phaenicophaeus pyrrhocephalus
 Family: Centropodidae
 Greater coucal R Centropus sinensis
 Brown coucal r Centropus andamanensis
 Lesser coucal r Centropus bengalensis
 Green-billed coucal  Vr Centropus chlororhynchus

Psittaciformes
 Family: Psittacidae
 Vernal hanging parrot R Loriculus vernalis
 Sri Lanka hanging parrot R Loriculus beryllinus
 Alexandrine parakeet R Psittacula eupatria
 Rose-ringed parakeet R Psittacula krameri
 Slaty-headed parakeet R Psittacula himalayana
 Grey-headed parakeet R Psittacula finschii
 Intermediate parakeet r? Psittacula intermedia
 Plum-headed parakeet R Psittacula cyanocephala
 Blossom-headed parakeet R Psittacula roseata
 Malabar parakeet R Psittacula columboides
 Layard's parakeet r Psittacula calthropae
 Derbyan parakeet r Psittacula derbiana
 Red-breasted parakeet R Psittacula alexandri
 Nicobar parakeet r Psittacula caniceps
 Long-tailed parakeet N R Psittacula longicauda

Apodiformes
 Family: Apodidae
 Glossy swiftlet R Collocalia esculenta
 Indian swiftlet R Collocalia unicolor
 Himalayan swiftlet R Collocalia brevirostris
 Black-nest swiftlet Collocalia maxima
 Edible-nest swiftlet R Collocalia fuciphaga
 White-rumped needletail R Zoonavena sylvatica
 White-throated needletail Hirundapus caudacutus
 Silver-backed needletail r Hirundapus cochinchinensis
 Brown-backed needletail R Hirundapus giganteus
 Asian palm swift R Cypsiurus balasiensis
 Alpine swift r Tachymarptis melba
 Common swift W Apus apus
 Pallid swift r Apus pallidus
 Pacific swift r Apus pacificus
 Dark-rumped swift V r Apus acuticauda
 House swift R Apus affinis
 Family: Hemiprocnidae
 Crested treeswift R Hemiprocne coronata

Strigiformes
 Family: Tytonidae
 Barn owl r Tyto alba
 Grass owl r Tyto capensis
 Oriental bay owl r Phodilus badius
 Family: Strigidae
 Andaman scops owl r Otus balli
 Mountain scops owl r Otus spilocephalus
 Pallid scops owl r Otus brucei
 Eurasian scops owl W Otus scops
 Moluccan scops owl V Otus magicus
 Indian scops owl R Otus lettia
 Oriental scops owl R Otus sunia
 Collared scops owl R Otus bakkamoena
 Eurasian eagle owl R Bubo bubo 
 Rock eagle owl R Bubo bengalensis 
 Spot-bellied eagle owl r Bubo nipalensis
 Dusky eagle owl R Bubo coromandus
 Brown fish owl r Ketupa zeylonensis
 Tawny fish owl r Ketupa flavipes
 Buffy fish owl r Ketupa ketupu
 Snowy owl V Nyctia scandiaca
 Mottled wood owl r Strix ocellata
 Brown wood owl r Strix leptogrammica
 Tawny owl r Strix aluco
 Hume's owl  Strix butleri
 Collared owlet r Glaucidium brodiei
 Asian barred owlet r Glaucidium cuculoides
 Jungle owlet R Glaucidium radiatum
 Chestnut-backed owlet N r Glaucidium castanonotum
 Little owl r Athene noctua
 Spotted owlet R Athene brama
 Forest owlet r Heteroglaux blewitti
 Tengmalm's owl V Aegolius funereus
 Brown hawk owl r Ninox scutulata
 Andaman hawk owl N r Ninox affinis
 Long-eared owl rw Asio otus
 Short-eared owl W Asio flammeus
 Family: Batrachostomidae
 Sri Lanka frogmouth r Batrachostomus moniliger
 Hodgson's frogmouth r Batrachostomus hodgsoni
 Family: Eurostopodidae
 Great eared nightjar r Eurostopodus macrotis
 Family: Caprimulgidae
 Grey nightjar R Caprimulgus indicus
 Eurasian nightjar rp Caprimulgus europaeus
 Egyptian nightjar V Caprimulgus aegyptius
 Sykes's nightjar r Caprimulgus mahrattensis
 Large-tailed nightjar R Caprimulgus macrurus
 Jerdon's nightjar R Caprimulgus atripennis
 Indian nightjar R Caprimulgus asiaticus
 Savanna nightjar r Caprimulgus affinis

Columbiformes
 Family: Columbidae
 Rock pigeon R Columba livia
 Hill pigeon R Columba rupestris
 Snow pigeon R Columba leuconota
 Yellow-eyed pigeon V w Columba eversmanni
 Common wood pigeon W Columba palumbus
 Speckled wood pigeon r Columba hodgsonii
 Ashy wood pigeon r Columba pulchricollis
 Nilgiri woodpigeon V r Columba elphinstonii
 Sri Lanka wood pigeon r V Columba torringtoni
 Pale-capped pigeon V w Columba punicea
 Andaman wood pigeon N r Columba palumboides
 European turtle dove V Streptopelia turtur
 Oriental turtle dove RW Streptopelia orientalis
 Laughing dove R Streptopelia senegalensis
 Spotted dove R Streptopelia chinensis
 Red collared dove R Streptopelia tranquebarica
 Eurasian collared dove R Streptopelia decaocto
 Barred cuckoo dove r Macropygia unchall
 Andaman cuckoo dove N r Macropygia rufipennis
 Emerald dove R Chalcophaps indica
 Nicobar pigeon r Caloenas nicobarica
 Orange-breasted green pigeon r Treron bicincta
 Pompadour green pigeon r Treron pompadora
 Thick-billed green pigeon r Treron curvirostra
 Yellow-footed green pigeon R Treron phoenicoptera
 Pin-tailed green pigeon r Treron apicauda
 Wedge-tailed green pigeon r Treron sphenura
 Green imperial pigeon r Ducula aenea
 Mountain imperial pigeon r Ducula badia
 Pied imperial pigeon r Ducula bicolor

Gruiformes
 Family: Otididae
 Little bustard N V Tetrax tetrax
 Great bustard V  Otis tarda
 Indian bustard E r Ardeotis nigriceps
 Macqueen's bustard N W Chlamydotis macqueeni
 Houbara bustard Chlamydotis undulata
 Bengal florican E r Houbaropsis bengalensis
 Lesser florican E r Sypheotides indica
 Family: Gruidae
 Siberian crane C W Grus leucogeranus
 Sarus crane V r Grus antigone
 Demoiselle crane W Grus virgo
 Common crane W Grus grus
 Hooded crane V Grus monacha
 Black-necked crane V r Grus nigricollis
 Family: Heliornithidae
 Masked finfoot V r Heliopais personata
 Family: Rallidae
 Andaman crake r Rallina canningi
 Red-legged crake V? Rallina fasciata
 Slaty-legged crake r Rallina eurizonoides
 Slaty-breasted rail r Gallirallus striatus
 Water rail rw Rallus aquaticus
 Corn crake V Crex crex
 Brown crake r Amaurornis akool
 White-breasted waterhen R Amaurornis phoenicurus
 Black-tailed crake r Porzana bicolor
 Little crake V Porzana parva
 Baillon's crake rw Porzana pusilla
 Spotted crake V Porzana porzana
 Ruddy-breasted crake r Porzana fusca
 Watercock r Gallicrex cinerea
 Purple swamphen R Porphyrio porphyrio
 Common moorhen R Gallinula chloropus
 Common coot RW Fulica atra

References

South Asia